Johnston House may refer to:

Asa Johnston Farmhouse, Johnsonville, Alabama, listed on the National Register of Historic Places (NRHP) in Conecuh County
James Johnston House (Half Moon Bay, California), listed on the NRHP in San Mateo County
Darius David Johnston House, Norwalk, California, listed on the NRHP in Los Angeles County
Johnston-Felton-Hay House, a.k.a. Johnston-Hay House, Macon, Georgia, a National Historic Landmark
Johnston House (Clay Village, Kentucky), listed on the NRHP in Shelby County
Johnston-Jacobs House, Georgetown, Kentucky, NRHP-listed in Scott County
John Johnston House (Sault Ste. Marie, Michigan), NRHP-listed
Johnston House (Carthage, Missouri), listed on the NRHP in Jasper County
Overfelt-Campbell-Johnston House, Independence, Missouri, listed on the NRHP in Jackson County
John S. Johnston House, Missoula, Montana, listed on the NRHP in Missoula County
Johnston-Muff House, Crete, Nebraska, listed on the NRHP in Saline County
Edwin M. and Emily S. Johnston House, Buffalo, New York, NRHP-listed
Capt. Simon Johnston House, Clayton, New York, NRHP-listed
Knox-Johnstone House, Cleveland, North Carolina, listed on the NRHP in Rowan County
John Johnston House (Yanceyville, North Carolina), listed on the National Register of Historic Places in Caswell County
William C. Johnston House and General Store, Burlington, Ohio, listed on the NRHP in Lawrence County
Johnston-Crossland House, Zanesville, Ohio, listed on the NRHP in Muskingum County 
Andrew J. and Anna B. Johnston Farmstead, Oregon City, Oregon, listed on the NRHP in Clackamas County
Lucas-Johnston House, Newport, Rhode Island, NRHP-listed
James Johnston House (Brentwood, Tennessee), NRHP-listed
Andrew Johnston House, Pearisburg, Virginia, NRHP-listed
Johnston-Meek House, Huntington, West Virginia, NRHP-listed
Johnston-Truax House, Weirton, West Virginia, NRHP-listed

See also
Johnston Hall (disambiguation)
James Johnston House (disambiguation)
John Johnston House (disambiguation)
as well as similar spellings
Johnson House (disambiguation)